Ricardo Mauricio Martínez Trimmer (born 1 June 1980 in Mexico, D. F., Mexico) is a Mexican former footballer. He played professionally as a midfielder in Liga MX.

Biography

Early years

Career
Martínez made his debut in the Mexican Primera with Club de Futbol Monterrey in a match against Club Leon on 11 March 1998.  He spent most of the next eight years with Monterrey before moving to Club Santos Laguna for a season.

References

External links
 
 

1980 births
Living people
Footballers from Mexico City
C.F. Monterrey players
C.D. Guadalajara footballers
Santos Laguna footballers
Atlético Morelia players
Association football midfielders
Mexican footballers